John Cutts (c. 1829 – 6 September 1872) was the jockey who at the age of 32 rode Archer, the winner of the first Melbourne Cup in 1861. The next day John rode Archer to win another long distance race, the Melbourne Town Plate. In May 1862 he rode Archer to win the Queen Elizabeth Stakes (ATC), and returned to Melbourne later that year to win his second Melbourne Cup. Due to a technical error which stopped Archer from being entered in the third (1863) Melbourne Cup, Cutts was not able to attempt to win the hat-trick.

Background
During his long career John 'Cutts' Dillon, was one of the best known, best liked and most respected jockeys in New South Wales. Keith W. Paterson in his book The Masters Touch, Racing with Etienne L. de Mestre, Winner of 5 Melbourne Cups tells us that he was "respected for his honesty, no less than for his skill as a horseman...gained the esteem of not only his fellow professionals but also of all owners of horses for whom he rode".

Early life and personal life
Johnny learnt his craft as a jockey at the stable of William Cutts, "the crack Homebush trainer". In 1859 Johnny married the widow of William Cutts, Mary Cutts (née Bradbury) (1839–1903) at Goulburn, the daughter of Walter & Mary Bradbury. Mary had been born on Norfolk Island in 1839, and at only 12 years old had married her first husband William Cutts in 1851 at Sydney. Johnny and Mary moved to Hartley where daughter Emma Dillon (1859–1887) was born that year, followed the next year by son Clement Dillon (1860–1900), two years later by John Thomas Dillon (1862–1915) back in Goulburn, and followed by the two youngest boys at Randwick in Sydney in 1864 and 1868: Walter Edward Dillon (1864–1928), and William Charles Dillon (1868–?).

Career
Archer, the horse John rode to victory in the first and second Melbourne Cups in 1861 and 1862, was from the stable of Etienne de Mestre at "Terara" near Nowra in New South Wales. Mary's brother Walter Bradbury (1835–1936), had also had been employed by Etienne, and had also been associated with Archer's training. In 1935 he told the Sydney Morning Herald "I remember the day when I saw Johnny Cutts off to his first Melbourne Cup."

John Cutts rode Archer in 16 of his 17 starts, winning 11 of these 16 races. The only race of Archer's where John did not ride him was once when Archer was ridden by Etienne de Mestre himself. Cutts last race for the de Mestre stable, and his last ride before retiring as a jockey, was on Archer who placed third in the three-mile Seventh Champion Sweepstakes at Ballarat on 1 October 1863. In total Cutts rode 56 times for de Mestre, beginning on 1 January 1858 at Homebush when he won the Consolation Stakes on Greenmantle. From 1858 to 1863, whilst his growing family was living at Hartley and Goulburn, he was the principal jockey for de Mestre's Nowra stable. Other horses ridden by Cutts for de Mestre included Veno, Mariner, Greenmantle, Sailor, Moss Rose, Exeter, Inheritor, Lauristina, Potentate, and Red Rover.

Heritage
A legend that has sprung up around the horse Archer is that his jockey, John Cutts, was an Aboriginal. Cutts was, according to the legend, born in the area around Nowra, and one of the many Aboriginal males who replaced the bulk of the white stockmen who walked off the land to join the goldrush. Although it would be romantic to believe that an Aboriginal jockey had won the first and second Melbourne Cups, the most famous horse race in Australia, the cold hard facts of history do not allow this notion. The spot in racing history for the first (and only) Aboriginal jockey to win the Melbourne Cup belongs to Frank Reys on Gala Supreme in 1973.

Instead of having any Aboriginal blood, Cutts was born of English stock. He had been born John Dillon in Sydney in about 1829, the son of Thomas Dillon, a clerk, and his wife Ann Butler. A family photo of him and his wife Mary has survived, published in Keith W. Paterson's book, that confirms that John does not have Aboriginal heritage.

Johnny is also remembered for winning the Queen's Plate at Flemington Racecourse in 1851 and 1852 on Cossack. John was then at the height of his fame, and won many other races for Cossack's trainer John Tait before he ever rode a horse for Etienne de Mestre.

Later life
After retiring from racing at the end of 1863 John continued to enjoy close contacts with the racing fraternity through the Half Way Hotel that he and his wife managed on Sydney Road, near Randwick Racecourse.

John 'Cutts' Dillon died, after an illness of more than 12 months, on 6 September 1872 at the age of 43. Coincidentally the horse with whom he will always be linked, Archer, died a few months later the same year in December 1872.

Johnny's family laid him to rest in Rookwood Cemetery. His long illness had dwindled his savings leaving his widow and children destitute. A subscription was raised for the benefit of his family, and £130 was collected in just the first few days.

Archer's races

Notes

References
 The Masters Touch, Racing with Etienne de Mestre, Winner of 5 Melbourne Cups by Keith W. Paterson, Published by Keith W. Paterson [Nowra] (2008), Page 46

Australian jockeys
1829 births
1872 deaths
Australian people of English descent